The Phoenix Building is a historic commercial building located at 315–321 Union Street in Rockland, Massachusetts.

Description and history 
It was built in 1929, and was designed by the Boston firm of Blackall, Clapp & Whittemore in the Classical Revival style. The building's facade is finished predominantly in cast ashlar stone, with copper pilasters separating the storefronts. It is one of Rockland's few surviving late-19th and early-20th century commercial buildings.

The building was added to the National Register of Historic Places on April 7, 1989.

See also
National Register of Historic Places listings in Plymouth County, Massachusetts

References

Commercial buildings on the National Register of Historic Places in Massachusetts
Buildings and structures in Rockland, Massachusetts
National Register of Historic Places in Plymouth County, Massachusetts

Commercial buildings completed in 1929
Neoclassical architecture in Massachusetts